Sticta tunjensis is a species of foliose lichen in the family Peltigeraceae. Found in Colombia, it was formally described by Bibiana Moncada and Robert Lücking in 2012. It has been found growing on both bark and on soil, and it often grows among liverworts in genus Plagiochila. The specific epithet tunjensis refers to the type locality. Sticta tunjensis is somewhat similar to Sticta weigelii in morphological features, but it is phylogenetically distinct.

References

tunjensis
Lichen species
Lichens described in 2012
Lichens of Colombia
Taxa named by Robert Lücking